Adrianna Lamalle (born 27 September 1982) is a French hurdler born in Les Abymes, Guadeloupe.

She finished 8th in the 100m hurdles final at the 2006 European Athletics Championships in Gothenburg.

She also won the bronze medal in the same event at the 2000 World Junior Championships running 13.27 seconds.

Adriana won the 100m hurdles at the 1st IAAF World Youth Championships in Bydgoszcz, Poland. she ran 13.08 to win, still the best time ever run by an athlete under the age of 18. She also ran 11.66 to finish third in the flat 100.

Her best time in the women's 100 hurdles is 12.67, which she achieved in 2006.

Prize list

National 
 French Outdoor Athletic Champion of 100 m hurdles in 2006 (12.67s) and 2007 (12.94s)
 3rd at French Athletics Championships of 100 m hurdles in 2005 (12.85s) and 2011 (13.07s)
 3rd at 60 m hurdles at the 2012 French Indoor Athletics Championships with 8.11s

International 
 Finalist and third relay runner of the 4 × 100 m relay at the 2006 European Championships (alongside Véronique Mang, Fabienne Béret-Martinel and Muriel Hurtis). Team did not finish due to injury in last leg of race.

Personal Bests 
 Outdoors :
100 metres : 11 s 49 (+0.0 m/s)	at Fort-de-France 17 April 1999
200 metres : 24 s 48 (+0.5 m/s)	at Doha  12 May 2006
100 metres hurdles : 12 s 67 (+0.7 m/s) at Tomblaine  22 July 2006
 Indoors :
60 metres : 7 s 59 at Reims  1 February 2008
50 metres hurdles : 6 s 95 at Aubière  25 February 2006
60 metres hurdles : 8 s 02 at Moscow  11 March 2006

References

External links
 
 
 
 Interview of Adrianna Lamalle at interviewsport.fr

1982 births
Living people
People from Les Abymes
French female hurdlers
French people of Guadeloupean descent
Guadeloupean female hurdlers
Mediterranean Games silver medalists for France
Athletes (track and field) at the 2005 Mediterranean Games
Universiade medalists in athletics (track and field)
Mediterranean Games medalists in athletics
Universiade silver medalists for France
Medalists at the 2005 Summer Universiade